Myopites lelea is a species of tephritid or fruit flies in the genus Myopites of the family Tephritidae.

Distribution
France.

References

Tephritinae
Insects described in 1973
Diptera of Europe